St Nicholas Market is a market in Corn Street, Bristol, England in The Exchange in the Bristol City Centre.  It is also home to the Bristol Farmers' Market, the Nails Market, and the Slow Food Market, all of which are located in front of the Exchange.

It was the location of the first Berni Inn in 1956, which became a large chain, at The Rummer, a historic pub.

Gallery

References

External links

 St Nicholas Markets, Bristol

Buildings and structures in Bristol
Retail markets in England
Shopping streets in Bristol